Season 1991–92 was the 108th football season in which Dumbarton competed at a Scottish national level, entering the Scottish Football League for the 86th time, the Scottish Cup for the 97th time, the Scottish League Cup for the 45th time and the Scottish Challenge Cup for the second time.

Overview 
It was almost fated that Dumbarton would win the Second Division championship, 100 years after their last reign as Scottish League champions.  However, the season was not without its ups and downs.  Early cup exits seemed to strengthen the club's will, with the B&Q cup defeat to Montrose at the beginning of October being followed by a run of 12 matches which produced 9 victories and just one loss – giving Dumbarton a four-point lead at the top of the table at Christmas.  For some reason the wins dried up, with only one victory being taken from the next 10 games.  However, this time Dumbarton were not to be denied, and a final unbeaten run of 7 games was enough to secure the title and Division 1 football for the following season.

In the Scottish Cup, after early wins over East Stirling and Alloa, Dumbarton fell to defeat to Highland League opponents Huntly in the third round.

In the League Cup, it would be the second round where Airdrie would defeat Dumbarton, but only after extra time.  A great effort, bearing in mind that Dumbarton played with just 8 players from early in the second half.

Finally, due to the success of the previous season's centenary cup, the competition was continued to be known as the B&Q Cup.  Dumbarton however once again tasted first round defeat, this time at the hands of Montrose.

Locally, Dumbarton's defence of the Stirlingshire Cup was short-lived, with a first round loss to Premier Division Falkirk.

Results & fixtures

Scottish Second Division

Skol Cup

B&Q Cup

Tennant's Scottish Cup

Stirlingshire Cup

Pre-season/Other Matches

League table

Player statistics

Squad 

|}

Transfers

Players in

Players out

Reserve Team
Dumbarton competed in the Scottish Reserve League (West), and with 4 wins and 6 draws from 34 games, finished 18th of 18.

In the Reserve League Cup, Dumbarton lost out to Morton in the first round.

Trivia
 Between the league game against Berwick Rangers on 9 November and the league game against Arbroath on 28 December, Ian MacFarlane did not concede a single goal - a record of 666 minutes - beating Tom Carson's record set in season 1983-84.
 The Scottish Cup match against Huntly on 25 January marked Stevie Gow's 100th appearance for Dumbarton in all national competitions - the 99th Dumbarton player to reach this milestone.
 The League match against Queen of the South on 1 February marked Charlie Gibson's 100th appearance for Dumbarton in all national competitions - the 100th Dumbarton player to reach this milestone.
 The League match against Stenhousemuir on 4 February marked Jim Dempsey's 100th appearance for Dumbarton in all national competitions - the 101st Dumbarton player to reach this milestone.
 Crippled by debts, Berwick Rangers had been evicted from their home at Shielfield Park, however Albion Rovers made their ground available for the away League match on 28 March.

See also
 1991–92 in Scottish football

References

External links
David Edgar (Dumbarton Football Club Historical Archive)
Scottish Football Historical Archive

Dumbarton F.C. seasons
Scottish football clubs 1991–92 season